Te Pīhopatanga o Aotearoa is home to Māori Anglicans across Aotearoa (New Zealand), and one of the three Tikanga (cultural streams) of the Anglican Church in Aotearoa, New Zealand and Polynesia. The first Māori Bishop was appointed in 1928, and the Pīhopatanga itself was established by General Synod as an autonomous body in 1978. According to the 2001 census there are approximately 75,000 Māori Anglicans in Aotearoa which makes it the largest Māori denomination. The Māori tikanga of the church is headed by Don Tamihere, Te Pīhopa o Aotearoa / Bishop of Aotearoa and Te Pīhopa o Te Tairāwhiti / Bishop of Tairāwhiti; Tamihere is the sixth Pīhopa o Aotearoa, succeeding the late Archbishop Brown Turei.

Episcopal Units
The 1992 constitution of the church enabled Te Rūnanga (assembly, i.e. synod; later Te Rūnanganui / general assembly) o Te Pīhopatanga to create sub-units called Hui Amorangi (lit. leaders' gathering; similar to the English 'synod') and to provide bishops for these. From an original position where these hui were mere divisions of Te Pīhopatanga, they have developed to "Episcopal Unit" status not incomparable to the "New Zealand dioceses" (whereby each hui amorangi pīhopa is Licensing Bishop {i.e. Ordinary} in her own right), and have come to each be called Pīhopatanga in themselves. , Te Pīhopatanga o Aotearoa is made up of five pīhopatanga / regional bishoprics:
Te Manawa o Te Wheke (lit. the heart of the octopus, i.e. north island central region)
Te Tairāwhiti (lit. east coast)
Te Tai Tokerau (lit. north coast)
Te Upoko o Te Ika (lit. the head of the fish, i.e. the southern part of the north island; Wellington/Taranaki)
Waipounamu (lit. south island)

References

Aotearoa, Te Pīhopatanga o